Baynouna Solar Power Plant is a 200 MW photovoltaic power station in Amman, Jordan. Construction began in late 2017, and it opened in 2020. The plant is the largest in the country and will produce 4% of Jordan's total electrical energy production, with the project costing around $260 million.

See also
Quweira Solar Power Plant
Shams Ma'an Solar Power Plant
Tafila Wind Farm

References 

Energy infrastructure completed in 2016
Solar power in Asia
Power stations in Jordan